Allomalorhagida is a class of worms belonging to the phylum Kinorhyncha. The class has no assigned orders, but is divided into four families.

Families
Allomalorhagida consists of the following families:

 Dracoderidae
 Franciscideridae
 Neocentrophyidae
 Pycnophyidae

References 

Kinorhyncha
Protostome classes